Bono: In Conversation with Michka Assayas (also known as Bono on Bono) is a 2005 book by music journalist Michka Assayas. The format is an extended interview that Assayas had with Bono over a period of several years. Bono discusses his upbringing, U2's beginnings, his band mates, his personal life, his faith and the effects of his celebrity status.

Chapters 

 Stories to tell that are not songs 
 Never trust a performer 
 Everybody gets out of here alive 
 Who's the Elvis here? 
 The shortest chapter in the book 
  The tattooist (El tatuador)
 At the bottom of the glass 
 The occasional missing leg
 Thou shalt not go to America 
 My life as a disaster groupie 
 Add eternity to that 
 The girl with the beard 
 5 Thirteen is an unlucky number 
 I am never going to fit Tutankhamon's Coffin 
 From the tents of Amhara to sleeping in Brezhnev's bed 
 Faith versus luck 
 Tidying my room

References 

Biographies about musicians
2005 non-fiction books
Bono
Riverhead Books books